, eldest son of Miyoshi Motonaga, was a Japanese samurai and powerful daimyō who ruled seven provinces of Kansai. 

Nagayoshi held the court titles of Shūri-dayū (修理太夫) and Chikuzen no Kami (筑前守), and was also known by the more Sinic reading of his name: Chōkei (長慶). During his tenure, the Miyoshi clan would experience a great rise of power, and engage in a protracted military campaign against its rivals, the Rokkaku and the Hosokawa. Nagayoshi defeated Ashikaga Yoshiteru and banished him from Kyoto in 1555.

Following his death, Nagayoshi was succeeded by his adopted son, Yoshitsugu (the son of Sogō Kazunari, his younger brother). Nagayoshi died in Iimoriyama Castle in 1564.

Family 

 Father: Miyoshi Motonaga
 Mother: Unknown
Siblings:
Miyoshi Yoshikata
Atagi Fuyuyasu
Sogō Kazumasa
 Wives
 Hatano Tanemichi's daughter
 Children
 Miyoshi Yoshioki

Further reading
Miyoshi Nagayoshi  『三好長慶』 人物文庫　(学陽書房2010) Tokunaga Shinichirō 
Miyoshi Nagayoshi 『三好長慶:諸人之を仰ぐこと北斗泰山』 (ミネルヴァ日本評伝選) Amano Tadayuki (ミネルヴァ書房 2014) 
Iimoriyama jo to Miyoshi Nagayoshi(Iimoriyama Castle and Miyoshi Nagayoshi) 『飯盛山城と三好長慶』　仁木宏,中井均,中西裕樹　(戎光祥出版 2015)

References

Miyoshi family tree and information (Japanese)
Data on the roots of Miyoshi Nagayoshi (Japanese)

Samurai
1522 births
1564 deaths
Daimyo
Miyoshi clan